The 1st Guards Tank Army is a tank army of the Russian Ground Forces.

The army traces its heritage back to the 1st Tank Army, formed twice in July 1942 and in January 1943 and converted into the 1st Guards Tank Army in January 1944. The army fought as part of the Red Army on the Eastern Front during World War II. The army was commanded throughout most of the war by Mikhail Katukov. 

It fought in the early defense during the Battle of Stalingrad, and Operation Uranus, and participated in the Battle of Kursk, Proskurov-Chernovtsy Operation, Lvov-Sandomierz Operation, Vistula-Oder Offensive and the Battle of Berlin. After the war, the army was stationed in East Germany as part of the Group of Soviet Forces in Germany.

After the end of the Cold War and the resultant withdrawal of Soviet units in Germany, the army was relocated to Smolensk, and disbanded in 1999. The army was reformed in 2014 as part of Russia's military expansion. This reformed army fought in the 2022 Russian invasion of Ukraine, where it is said to have suffered heavy casualties following its eventual retreats from the Northeast and later Kharkiv.

First formation 
The 1st Tank Army was first formed within the Stalingrad Front from the 38th Army in July 1942, under the command of Major General Kirill Moskalenko. The army was encircled and partially destroyed. It was disbanded as a result in August 1942, its headquarters becoming the Southeastern Front headquarters.

Second formation 
The 1st Tank Army was formed a second time on 30 January 1943 (order No.46021) from the headquarters of the 29th Army, under the command of famous armoured troops commander Lieutenant General of Tank Troops Mikhail Katukov, personally appointed by Stalin. The army was transferred to the North-Western Front. The 3rd Mechanised Corps (later to become 8th Guards Mechanised Corps) and 6th Tank Corps (later to become 11th Guards Tank Corps) joined it on formation, and served with the army throughout the war. 

It was quickly transferred to Voronezh Front for the defense of the Kursk salient's southern shoulder. It was awarded a Guards title and became the 1st Guards Tank Army in April 1944, and Katukov was promoted to Colonel General.

On 1 January 1945, the Army's principal combat formations were:

 8th Guards Mechanized Corps (Major General Ivan Dremov) (3 January 1944 – 9 May 1945)
 19th Guards Mechanized Brigade
 20th Guards Mechanized Brigade
 21st Guards Mechanized Brigade
 1st Guards Tank Brigade
 48th Guards Separate Tank Regiment
 353rd Guards Self-Propelled Artillery Regiment
 400th Guards Self-Propelled Artillery Regiment
 265th Guards Mortar Regiment *
 405th Guards Mortar Battalion *
 358th Guards Anti-Aircraft Artillery Regiment
 8th Guards Motorcycle Battalion
 11th Guards Tank Corps (Colonel Hamazasp Babadzhanian) (25 August 1944 – 9 May 1945)
 40th Guards Tank Brigade
 44th Guards Tank Brigade
 45th Guards Tank Brigade
 27th Guards Motor Rifle Brigade
 399th Guards Heavy Self-Propelled Artillery Regiment
 362nd Guards Self-Propelled Artillery Regiment
 1454th Self-Propelled Artillery Regiment
 350th Light Artillery Regiment
 270th Guards Mortar Regiment *
 53rd Guards Mortar Battalion *
 1018th Anti-Aircraft Artillery Regiment
 9th Guards Motorcycle Battalion
 Army Troops
 64th Guards Tank Brigade
 11th Guards Separate Tank Regiment
 19th Light Self-Propelled Artillery Brigade
 197th Light Artillery Brigade
 79th Guards Mortar Regiment *
 17th Motorised Engineer Brigade
 191st Guards Liaison Aviation Regiment
 6th Motorcycle Regiment
 12th Guards Motorcycle Regiment

* Guards Mortar Regiment (or Battalion) was the overt designation used for Katyusha rocket launcher units.

It participated in the Battle of Kursk, the Proskurov-Chernovtsy Operation, Lvov-Sandomierz Operation, the Vistula-Oder Offensive, and the Battle of Berlin.

The 1st Guards Tank Army was awarded the Order of the Red Banner postwar. It became part of the Soviet occupation force in Germany, known as Group of Soviet Forces in Germany, with its headquarters in Dresden. In 1968, it, along with the 11th Guards Tank and 20th Guards Motor Rifle Divisions, took part in the Soviet invasion of Czechoslovakia, after which the units returned to their garrisons.

In the late 1980s the Army included the 20th Guards Motor Rifle Division, 9th Tank Division, and 11th Guards Tank Division. The headquarters was withdrawn to Smolensk, in the Moscow Military District in the early 1990s, and lost the 'Tank' from its title in 1995. In its last period within the Russian Army it comprised the 4th Guards 'Kantemir' Tank Division and the 144th Motor Rifle Division (which had been withdrawn from Tallinn in Estonia). It was disbanded in 1998.

1988 structure 
The army's composition in 1988 was (with main equipment), with honorific titles in italics:

 Army Headquarters, Dresden
 234th Separate Guard and Security Battalion, Dresden
 3rd Separate Guards Carpathian Communications Regiment, Dresden
 253rd Separate Radio Engineering Regiment, Merseburg
 51st Separate Radio Engineering Battalion, Dresden
 106th Separate Electronic Warfare Battalion, Dresden
 595th Separate Intelligence Gathering Battalion, Chemnitz (K-611)
 6th Separate Airborne Battalion, Dresden
 308th Artillery Brigade, Zeithain (2c5 Hyacinth)
 181st Guards Novozybkovskaya Red Banner Orders of Suvorov and Alexander Nevsky Missile Brigade, Kochstedt
 432nd Missile Brigade, Wurzen
 53rd Anti-Aircraft Rocket Brigade, Altenburg
 443rd Separate Engineer and Combat Engineering Battalion, Dresden
 68th Pontoon Bridge Regiment, Dresden
 41st Materiel Support Brigade, Dresden
 303rd Separate Repair and Recovery Battalion, Dresden
 338th Separate Repair and Recovery Battalion, Dresden
 225th Separate Attack Helicopter Regiment, Allstedt (Mil Mi-24)
 485th Separate Attack Helicopter Regiment, Brandis (Mil Mi-24)
 6th Separate Transport Helicopter Squadron, Klotzsche (Mil Mi-8)
 9th Bobruisk-Berlin Order of the Red Banner Order of Suvorov Tank Division, Riesa
 11th Guards Berlin-Carpathian Tank Division, Dresden
 20th Guards Taganrog Red Banner Order of the Suvorov Division Motor Rifle Division, Grimma

Reactivation 

After a 15-year hiatus, the Army was reconstituted in November 2014, probably on 13 November 2014.

The army was formed as the main ground forces manoeuvre and reserve operational formation of the Western Military District, in addition to the 6th Combined Arms Army (headquartered in Saint Petersburg) and the 20th Guards Combined Arms Army (headquartered in Voronezh). It is considered an elite formation of the Russian Ground Forces. The army carries on the traditions of the chronologically first army of the Soviet Union to reach 'Guards status. 

It commands the 2nd Guards Motor Rifle and the 4th Guards Tank Divisions, which are considered the elite formations of their respective combat arms. The most decorated divisions of the Soviet Army, they were garrisoned the closest to Moscow for the city's defense.  Due to their proximity to the capital, extra scrutiny was applied to personnel of these formations, making these postings especially prestigious. These units received the latest hardware and were thus known as the 'household' divisions of the Soviet Army. Their loyalty to the government was demonstrated by their involvement in the 1991 Soviet coup d'état attempt. The divisions retained their elite status within the Russian Army. The army also included the 6th Separate Guards Tank and the 27th Separate Guards Motor Rifle Brigades. While the 4th Guards Tank Division uses T-80 tanks, the rest of the Army uses T-72B and T-90 tanks, and Kurganets-25 fighting vehicles.

 the Army was composed of:

 Army Headquarters (Odintsovo, Moscow Oblast)
 60th Command Brigade (Selyatino village near Odintsovo, Moscow Oblast)
 2nd Guards Motor Rifle 'Tamanskaya' Division (Kalininets, Moscow Oblast)
 4th Guards Tank 'Kantemirovskaya' Division (Naro-Fominsk, Moscow Oblast) with T-80 tanks
 47th Guards Tank Division (Mulino, Nizhny Novgorod Oblast, reestablished 2022)
 27th Guards Motor Rifle 'Sevastopol' Brigade (Mosrentgen, Moscow City)
 112th Guards Missile 'Novorossiysk' Brigade (Shuya, Ivanovo Oblast) (9K720 Iskander)
 288th Artillery 'Warsaw' Brigade (Mulino, Nizhny Novgorod Oblast)
 49th Anti-Aircraft Rocket Brigade (Krasnyi Bor, Smolensk Oblast) (Buk-M2)
 96th ISTAR Brigade (Sormovo, Nizhny Novgorod City)
 20th NBC Defence Regiment (Tsentralny, Nizhny Novgorod Oblast) (MUN 12102)
 69th Logistics Brigade (Dzerzhinsk, Nizhny Novgorod Oblast)

 Russo-Ukrainian War 

During the 2021–2022 Russo-Ukrainian crisis, elements of the 1st Guards Tank Army were reported to have forward deployed to the Pogonovo training ground south of Voronezh. Main battle tanks, self-propelled and towed artillery, and long-range multiple rocket launchers (MRLs), reportedly drawn from the 4th Guards Tank Division and the 2nd Motorised Rifle Division, were reported to have been positioned in the vicinity of Voronezh. A few months before the invasion, the 47th Guards Tank Division was formed from the 6th Separate Guards Tank Brigade.

After the invasion began in February 2022, the Army took part in the Northeastern Ukraine offensive of the 2022 Russian invasion of Ukraine, with the 2nd Guards MRD taking part in the failed Siege of Chernihiv. Ukraine reported in May 2022 that the Ukrainian Main Intelligence Directorate had obtained documents showing that after 3 weeks of fighting the 1st Guards Tank Army had sustained 409 casualties (61 KIA, 209 WIA, 44 missing, 96 surrendered), and 308 units of military equipment had been seized.

The United Kingdom Ministry of Defence reported on 19 May 2022 that army commander General-Lieutenant Sergey Kisel had been suspended for his failure to capture Kharkiv. On 13 September 2022, UK Defence Intelligence identified 1st Guards Tank Army as the primary force that retreated from Kharkiv Oblast during the Ukrainian Kharkiv counteroffensive. Having suffered heavy casualties, it described the army as "severely degraded" and its ability to counter NATO "severely weakened." By December, the UK MoD reported that the Army had been replenished with recruits, and was active in the Battle of Svatove.

 Commanders of the Army 

 Katukov, Mikhail Yefimovich – Guard ColGen, 1943–1947
 Belov, Yeftikhin Emelyanovich – Guard LtGen, 1947–1951
 Govorunenkov, Pyotr Dmitrievich – Guard GenLt, 1951–1953
 Yakubovsky, Ivan Ignatyevitch – Guard GenLt, 1953–1957
 Tolubko, Vladimir Fyodorovich – Guard MajGen, 1957–1958
 Ukhov, Vladimir Dmitrievich – Guard MajGen, 1958–1961
 Ivanovski, Yevgeny Filippovich – Guard MajGen, 1961–1964
 Kotsasnov, Konstantin Grigoryevich – Guard GenLt, 1964–1968
 Gerasimov, Ivan Aleksandrovich – Guard GenLt, 1968–1971
 Lushev, Pyotr Georgievich – Guard GenLt, 1971–1973
 Snetkov, Boris Vasilievich – Guard LtGen, 1973–1975
 Popov, Nikolai Ivanovich – Guard LtGen, 1975–1979
 Sovotskin, Roman Mikhailovich – Guard LtGen, 1979–1981
 Osipov, Vladimir Vasilyevich – Guard LtGen, 1981–1983
 Shein, Boris Pertovich – Guard LtGen, 1983–1986
 Tchernitsov, Anatoli Kupyanovich – Guard LtGen, 1986–1990
 Kolchkin, Gennadi Andreevich – Guard LtGen, 1990–1992
 Shevtsov, Leonti Pavlovich – Guard LtGen, 1992–1993
 Sosyedov, Vasili Petrovich – Guard LtGen, 1993–1995
 Roshchin, Viktor Mikhailovich – Guard LtGen, 1995–1999
 Did not exist (1999–2014)
 Aleksandr Chaiko – Guard LtGen, 2014–2018
 Kisel, Sergei Aleksandrovich - Guard LtGen, 2018–2020

 References 

 Bonn, K.E. 'Slaughterhouse – The Handbook of the Eastern Front', Aberjona Press, 2005
 Duncan, Andrew 'Russian Forces in Decline – Part 3', Jane's Intelligence Review, November 1996.
 V.I. Feskov, Golikov V.I., K.A. Kalashnikov, and S.A. Slugin''', The Armed Forces of the USSR after World War II, from the Red Army to the Soviet (Part 1: Land Forces).'' (В.И. Слугин С.А. Вооруженные силы СССР после Второй Мировой войны: от Красной Армии к Советской (часть 1: Сухопутные войска)) Tomsk, 2013.
 Glantz, David M. 'Companion to Colossus Reborn' University Press of Kansas, 2005.
 

Tank armies of the Soviet Union
Military units and formations established in 1942
Military units and formations awarded the Order of the Red Banner
Guards Armies
Armies of the Russian Federation